Michael Schulman is an American sports executive. He is the CEO and alternate governor of the Anaheim Ducks of the National Hockey League (NHL).

References

Year of birth missing (living people)
Living people
National Hockey League executives
Anaheim Ducks executives